Caldwell is a small village in south Derbyshire, England within the National Forest and in the parish of Cauldwell. At the 2011 census, the population is listed under the civil parish of Drakelow.

References

External links
 Caldwell.org.uk accessed 3 January 2008

Villages in Derbyshire
South Derbyshire District